Man Overboard is a studio album by Canadian hip hop musician Buck 65.  Originally released on Anticon in 2001, it was re-released on Warner Bros. Records in 2002.

Reception
Man Overboard has received generally favorable reviews from critics. Clay Jarvis of Stylus Magazine called the album "a revolutionary album, using coolness as an instrument of subversion." Robert Christgau gave it an "A−" rating. Thomas Quinlan of Exclaim! noted that "[the] beats are Buck's most laid back yet, but with a tendency towards some low-end sounds."

Track listing
2001 Anticon release

2002 Warner Bros. Records re-release

References

External links
 

Buck 65 albums
Anticon albums
2001 albums